The molecular formula C13H15NO2 (molar mass: 217.26 g/mol, exact mass: 217.1103 u) may refer to:

Glutethimide
Methastyridone
Methylenedioxypropargylamphetamine (MDPL)
Securinine

Molecular formulas